This is a list of abbreviations used in health informatics.

 ACA, Affordable Care Act
 DICOM, a standard for handling, storing, printing, and transmitting information in medical imaging. It includes a file format definition and a network communications protocol. The communication protocol is an application protocol that uses TCP/IP to communicate between systems. DICOM files can be exchanged between two entities that are capable of receiving image and patient data in DICOM format.
 HITM, European Association of Healthcare IT Managers
 RIS, Radiology Information System
 HIS,  Hospital Information System
 PACS, Picture Archiving and Communications System
 EHR  Electronic Health Record
 HTA Healthcare Technology Assessment
 RFID  Radio Frequency Identification
 CALLIOPE, a European coordination network for eHealth interoperability implementation, launched on 1 June 2008 by the EU-funded Thematic Network with a duration of 30 months
 CEN The European Committee for Standardization (CEN) a European business organization aimed at removing trade barriers for European industry and consumers.
 DG INFSO, Directorate-General for Information Society and Media (European Commission), a Directorate-General of the European Commission that deals with research, policy and regulation on the areas of information and communication technology and media.
 ICT, Information and Communication Technologies
 e-health (also written e-health) is a relatively recent term for healthcare practice supported by electronic processes and communication, dating back to at least 1999. Usage of the term varies: some would argue it is interchangeable with health informatics with a broad definition covering electronic/digital processes in health, while others use it in the narrower sense of healthcare practice using the Internet.
 Mhealth (also written as m-health or mobile health), a sub-segment of eHealth used for the practice of medical and public health supported by mobile devices for health services and information.

Health informatics
Informatics
Health informatics